Broadmoor is a planned Capital MetroRail commuter rail infill station in Austin, Texas. The station is being built to improve access to The Domain, a major high-density business, retail, and residential center. Construction was expected to begin in September 2020 with service starting in 2022, but was delayed until the station’s groundbreaking on January 18, 2022, thereby pushing the opening date back to 2024. Upon opening of the new station as well as the forthcoming McKalla Place station at Austin FC’s Q2 Stadium, the nearby Kramer station is expected to close. Brandywine Realty and the Charles Schwab Corporation contributed funds for the station's construction.

References

Future Capital MetroRail stations
Proposed railway stations in the United States
Railway stations scheduled to open in 2024